The Polynesian Voyaging Society (PVS) is a non-profit research and educational corporation based in Honolulu, Hawaii. PVS was established to research and perpetuate traditional Polynesian voyaging methods. Using replicas of traditional double-hulled canoes, PVS undertakes voyages throughout Polynesia navigating  without modern instruments.

History
The society was founded in 1973 by nautical anthropologist Ben Finney, Hawaiian artist Herb Kawainui Kane, and sailor Charles Tommy Holmes. The three wanted to show that ancient Polynesians could have purposely settled the Polynesian Triangle using non-instrument navigation. The first PVS project was to build a replica of a double-hulled voyaging canoe.

In the genesis of the Society, the East–West Center was instrumental in convincing the UN authorities in the Pacific of the necessity of the project. The navigator Pius "Mau" Piailug, master of the techniques of traditional navigation, was named Special Fellow by the Center.

Hōkūleʻa

On March 8, 1975, the first voyaging canoe to be built in the Hawaiian Islands in over 600 years was launched  with captain Kawika Kapahulehua and crew.  Named the Hōkūleʻa, it left Hawaii on May 1, 1976 for Tahiti in an attempt to retrace the ancient voyaging route.  Micronesian navigator Mau Piailug, using no instruments, successfully navigated the canoe to Tahiti, arriving there on June 3, 1976.

After an attempted voyage to Tahiti in 1978 was aborted when the Hokulea capsized near Lānai and crew member Eddie Aikau was lost at sea, Piailug trained Nainoa Thompson in the ancient navigation methods.  Two years later in 1980, Thompson replicated the successful 1976 voyage to Tahiti, becoming the first modern Hawaiian to master the art of Micronesian navigation.

Since that voyage, the Hokulea and her sister canoe the Hawaiiloa (built 1991–94) have undertaken voyages to other islands in Polynesia, including Samoa, Tonga, and New Zealand. More recently, in 2012 the Polynesian Voyaging Society built a further sister ship, the Hikianalia.

From 2014 to 2017, Nainoa Thompson and the Mālama Honua Worldwide Voyage engaged on a 3-year trip to visit 13 marine World Heritage Sites around the world. UNESCO and the Polynesian Voyaging Society had signed a partnership agreement to promote those historical sites through PVS' sailing adventures.

Alingano Maisu
On January 23, 2007 the Hokulea and the Alingano Maisu set sail on a voyage to Micronesia and Japan. In March 2007, the canoes arrived at Piailug's home island of Satawal where five native Hawaiians and sixteen others were inducted into Pwo as master navigators. The event was the first Pwo ceremony on Satawal in 50 years and the Alingano Maisu was presented to Piailug as a gift for his contribution in reviving wayfinding navigation.

Funding
The Times Online reported in March 2009 that the US Congress had earmarked $238,000 for the Polynesian Voyaging Society. The funding was targeted by John McCain as pork-barrel-funding.

Recognition
2015: Nainoa Thompson is awarded the Asia Pacific Community Building Award by the East–West Center

References

 Ben R. Finney; Sailing in the Wake of the Ancestors: Reviving Polynesian Voyaging (Bishop Museum Press, 2004 )
 Ben R. Finney; Voyage of Rediscovery: A Cultural Odyssey Through Polynesia (University of California Press, 1994 )
 Will Kyselka; An Ocean in Mind (University of Hawaii Press, 1987 )
 David Lewis; We, the Navigators: The Ancient Art of Landfinding in the Pacific (University of Hawaii Press; 1994 )

External links
Polynesian Voyaging Society official site
Navigators' journey of spirit, skill ends

Hawaii culture
Organizations based in Hawaii
Yachting associations
Hōkūleʻa
Polynesian navigation
Maritime organizations
1973 establishments in Hawaii
Organizations established in 1973